The Gorges du Guiers Vif (or Gorges du Frou) is a canyon located in Isère and Savoie between the towns of Corbel and Saint-Christophe-sur-Guiers, and having as tributary the Guiers Vif.

Transportation
In 1994 a little road was built that directly connects Saint-Pierre-d'Entremont in Savoie to Corbel.  It passes through the Gorges du Guiers Vif. However, for driving people, it is reserved to the residents.

References 

Guiers Vif
Landforms of Auvergne-Rhône-Alpes